Si̇lopi̇ Cudi̇spor is a Turkish sports club based in Şirnak near Diyarbakır, mainly concentrated on football.

Sidespor is currently playing in the Turkish Regional Amateur League.

Stadium
, the team plays at the 1000-person capacity Si̇lopi̇ İlçe stadium.

League participations
TFF Second League: 2002–2003
TFF Third League: 1998–2002, 2003–?
Turkish Amateur Football Leagues
Turkish Regional Amateur League: 2016–2017

References

External links
TFF 

Football clubs in Turkey